Prem Rog is a 1982 Hindi-language musical romantic drama directed by Raj Kapoor, with screenplay written by Jainendra Jain and Kamna Chandra. The film tells the story of a man's (Rishi Kapoor) love towards a woman, who is a higher status widow (Padmini Kolhapure). This film marked Raj Kapoor's return to social themes.

Prem Rog released on 30 July 1982 and emerged as a major commercial success at the box-office, becoming the second highest-grossing film of 1982 after Vidhaata (also starring Kolhapure and Shammi Kapoor). It received widespread critical acclaim for its direction, story, screenplay, soundtrack, cinematography and performances of the cast, with particular praise directed towards Kolhapure's performance. 

At the 30th Filmfare Awards, Prem Rog received a leading 12 nominations, including Best Film, Best Actor (Rishi) and Best Supporting Actress (Nanda), and won a leading 4 awards (tying with Shakti), including Best Director (Raj) and Best Actress (Kolhapure).

Over the years, Prem Rog has achieved the status of an all-time classic of Raj, Rishi and Kolhapure's careers.

Plot 
Devdhar (Rishi Kapoor) is a poor orphan who in his childhood had a magnetic friendship with Manorama (Padmini Kolhapure), the only niece of the rich and powerful Bade Thakur (Shammi Kapoor), and daughter of Virender Singh known as Chhote Thakur (Kulbhushan Kharbanda), who has a secret affair with Chamiya (Bindu). The benevolent Thakur helped Devdhar go to the city for higher studies. 8 years later, Devdhar returns to his village, where he finds Manorama has grown up. After seeing her again, Devdhar falls in love and expects that Manorama also has feelings for her. However Manorama does not have reciprocal emotions. The day Devdhar intends to ask her hand from Bade Thakur, whom he considers to be broad minded of all the village elders, he meets Kunwar Narendra Pratap Singh (Vijayendra Ghatge) Manorama's to-be-groom, who not only is more wealthier than Manorama's family, but Manorama also expresses her infatuation towards the man. Devdhar does not express her feelings and only persons who with slight idea about it are his cousin Radha and Manorama's mother Chhoti Maa.

Kunwar Narendra Pratap Singh loves Manorama dearly however he dies three days after the marriage in a road accident and she becomes a widow. At her own home, she is being prepared to have her head shaved against the protest of Chhoti Maa and Bade Thakur when Raj Rani (Tanuja), sister-in-law of Kunwar Narendra Pratap Singh intervenes and takes Manorama with her. Where she slowly tries to piece her life together with help of her Raj Rani and her son but one day, after Raja Virendra Pratap Singh (Raza Murad), her brother-in-law, rapes her, she returns to her parental home. When Devdhar learns of the situation, he works to rebuild Manorama's life and bring a smile to her face. Devdhar is determined to revive her faith in life and love. In doing so, he eventually has to face the wrath of the powerful Thakur, armed with old-age traditions and customs in his favor.

Manorama had only confessed to her mother about the events post her widow ship. Her brother-in-law and father both are enraged about her affair with Devdhar and swear to kill Devdhar and force her to go back to her in-law's palace. A battle ensues in the village and in the end they both reunite.

Cast 
 Rishi Kapoor as Devdhar "Dev," a penniless-but-educated orphan raised by his maternal uncle
 Padmini Kolhapure as Manorama "Rama" Singh, the daughter of the local aristocratic family
 Shammi Kapoor as Bade Raja Thakur, Rama's paternal uncle
 Nanda as Chhoti Maa, Rama's mother
 Tanuja as Raj Rani, wife of Raja Virendra Pratap Singh
 Sushma Seth as Badi Maa, wife of Bade Raja
 Kulbhushan Kharbanda as Virendra "Vir" Singh, Rama's father
 Raza Murad as Raja Virendra Pratap Singh Narendra's elder brother
Om Prakash as Panditji, the priest; Dev's maternal uncle
 Dulari as Panditji's wife
 Vijayendra Ghatge as Kunwar Narendra Pratap Singh, Rama's ex husband
 Bindu as Chamiya

Soundtrack 
All songs are composed by Laxmikant–Pyarelal.

Reception

Critical Reception 

Prem Rog received widespread critical acclaim for its direction, story, screenplay, soundtrack, cinematography and performances of the cast, with particular praise directed towards Kolhapure's performance.

It was listed by Cosmopolitan magazine as one of its "Top 10 Most Romantic Films Ever".

Box-Office 

Prem Rog grossed ₹13 crore, including a nett of ₹6.5 crore, becoming the second highest-grossing film of 1982 after Vidhaata. 

Box Office India gave it a verdict of a 'blockbuster'.

Awards & Nominations 

|-
| rowspan="12"|1983
| Raj Kapoor
| Best Director
| 
|-
| Padmini Kolhapure
| Best Actress
| 
|-
| Santosh Anand (for "Mohabbat Hai Kya Cheez")
| Best Lyricist
| 
|-
| Raj Kapoor
| Best Editing
| 
|-
| Raj Kapoor (for R. K. Films)
| Best Film
| 
|-
| Rishi Kapoor
| Best Actor
| 
|-
| Nanda
| Best Supporting Actress
| 
|-
| Kamna Chandra
| Best Story
| 
|-
| Laxmikant–Pyarelal
| Best Music Director
| 
|-
| Ameer Qazalbash (for "Meri Kismat Mein Tu")
| Best Lyricist
| 
|-
| Suresh Wadkar (for "Main Hoon Prem Rogi")
| rowspan="2"|Best Male Playback Singer
| 
|-
| Suresh Wadkar (for "Meri Kismat Mein Tu" )
| 
|}

References

External links 

Films directed by Raj Kapoor
1982 films
1980s Hindi-language films
Films scored by Laxmikant–Pyarelal
R. K. Films films
Films about widowhood in India